Milano United was a South African football club based in the Grassy Park suburb of the city of Cape Town that played in the National First Division.

Milano won promotion to the National First Division in July 2012 after winning the 2011-12 Western Cape Vodacom League stream and winning three games at the playoffs stage. On August 1, 2017, it was confirmed that Milano United FC sold their NFD (the second tier of South Africa football) club status to Tshakhuma Tsha Madzivhandila FC.

Honours
2011-12 Second Division Western Cape Stream champions

Club officials/Technical team
Owner/Chairman:  Nasief Brenner
General manager:  Sean Ferrier
Team manager:  Faiek Cassiem
 Head Coach:  Rafiek Taylor
Assistant coaches:  Aneez Basadien &  Kamaal Sait

2013–14 First team squad
As of September 18, 2013

Shirt sponsor & kit manufacturer
Shirt sponsor: None
Kit manufacturer: Adidas

References

External links
 
Premier Soccer League

 
National First Division clubs
SAFA Second Division clubs
Soccer clubs in Cape Town
Association football clubs established in 1986
1986 establishments in South Africa